Bridget Motha (born 20 April 1986) is a South African soccer midfielder who currently plays for the Milano United. He previously played for Slovak club FK Senica.

External links
at fccapetown.com

References

1986 births
Living people
South African soccer players
South African expatriate soccer players
Association football midfielders
Thanda Royal Zulu F.C. players
Western Province United F.C. players
University of Pretoria F.C. players
F.C. Cape Town players
Cape Town All Stars players
Mthatha Bucks F.C. players
Real Kings F.C. players
FK Senica players
Slovak Super Liga players
South African expatriate sportspeople in Slovakia
Expatriate footballers in Slovakia
Soccer players from the Free State (province)
Sportspeople from Bloemfontein